Jane Wyman (born Sarah Jane Mayfield; January 5, 1917 – September 10, 2007) was an American actress. She received an Academy Award, three Golden Globe Awards and nominations for two Primetime Emmy Awards.

Wyman's professional career began at age 16 in 1933, when she signed with Warner Bros. A popular contract player, she frequently played the leading lady, appearing in films such as Public Wedding (1937), Brother Rat (1938), its sequel Brother Rat and a Baby (1940), Bad Men of Missouri (1941), Stage Fright (1950), So Big (1953), Magnificent Obsession (1954), and All That Heaven Allows (1955). She received four nominations for the Academy Award for Best Actress, winning for Johnny Belinda (1948). In her later years, she achieved continuing success on the soap opera Falcon Crest (1981–1990), portraying the role of villainous matriarch Angela Channing.

Wyman was the first wife of Hollywood actor and the future 40th president of the United States, Ronald Reagan.

Early life

Sarah Jane Mayfield was born on January 5, 1917, in St. Joseph, Missouri, to Gladys Hope ( Christian; 1891–1960) and Manning Jeffries Mayfield (1895–1922).  Her father was a meal company laborer and her mother was a doctor's stenographer and office assistant.  Wyman was an only child biologically, but she had two foster siblings, whom she would refer to when saying she was the youngest of three.  Wyman's birth parents were married in March 1916 in Jackson County, Missouri.  The 1920 census showed her to be the only child from the marriage, and aged three years old on January 15, 1920, and living in Philadelphia, Pennsylvania.

In October 1921, her biological parents divorced and her father died unexpectedly three months later.  After his death, her mother moved to Cleveland, Ohio, leaving her to be reared by foster parents, Emma (née Reiss) and Richard D. Fulks, the chief of detectives in Saint Joseph.  She took their surname unofficially, including in her school records and on her marriage certificate to first husband Ernest Wyman.

Her unsettled family life resulted in few pleasurable memories.  Wyman later said "I was raised with such strict discipline that it was years before I could reason myself out of the bitterness I brought from my childhood."

In 1928, aged 11, she moved to Southern California with her foster mother. In 1930, the two moved back to Missouri, where Sarah Jane attended Lafayette High School in Saint Joseph.  That same year, she began a radio singing career, calling herself Jane Durrell and adding years to her birthdate to work legally because she was under-aged. 

For many years, Wyman's birthdate was widely reported to be January 4, 1914, but research by biographers and genealogists indicated that she was actually born three years later.
The most likely reason for the 1914 year of birth is that she added to her age in order to gain employment doing odd jobs and working as an actress, even though she was still a minor.  She may have moved her birthday back by one day to January 4 so as to share the same birthday as her daughter, Maureen. After Wyman's death, a release posted on her official website confirmed these details.

Career

Beginnings

After dropping out of Lafayette in 1932 at age 15, she returned to Hollywood, taking on odd jobs as a manicurist and a switchboard operator.

She started to obtain small parts in such films as The Kid from Spain (as a "Goldwyn Girl"; 1932), Elmer, the Great (1933), Gold Diggers of 1933 (1933), Harold Teen (1934), College Rhythm (1934), Rumba (1935), All the King's Horses (1935), George White's 1935 Scandals (1935), Stolen Harmony (1935), Broadway Hostess (1935), King of Burlesque (1936) and Anything Goes (1936).

She signed a contract with Warner Brothers in 1936.

Warner Bros.
At Warners she was in Freshman Love (1936) and Bengal Tiger (1936) then went to Universal for My Man Godfrey (1936).

At Warners she was in Stage Struck (1936), Cain and Mabel (1936), and Here Comes Carter (1936).

Wyman had her first big role in a Dick Foran Western The Sunday Round-Up (1936).

Wyman had small parts in Polo Joe (1936), and Gold Diggers of 1937 (1936) but a bigger one in Smart Blonde (1936), the first of the Torchy Blane series.

Wyman was in Ready, Willing and Able (1937), The King and the Chorus Girl (1937), and Slim (1937). She had the lead in Little Pioneer (1937), a short, and parts in The Singing Marine (1937).

"B" pictures
By the time Wyman starred in Public Wedding (1937), a "B", she was already divorced from first husband Ernest Wyman. However, she would retain use of his surname for the remainder of her career.

She had a support part in Mr. Dodd Takes the Air (1937) and the female lead in some "B" The Spy Ring (1938) (at Universal), He Couldn't Say No (1938) with Frank McHugh and Wide Open Faces (1938) with Joe E. Brown.

Wyman was borrowed by MGM to play a supporting part in The Crowd Roars (1938).

At Warners she had the lead in Brother Rat (1938), a "B" which proved popular. It co starred Ronald Reagan, Priscilla Lane, Wayne Morris and Eddie Albert.

Wyman was borrowed by Fox for a support part in Tail Spin (1939), then did The Kid from Kokomo (1939) with Pat O'Brien and Morris. She played the title role in Torchy Blane.. Playing with Dynamite (1939), but it was the last in the series.

Wyman was now established as a leading lady, albeit of Bs – she did Kid Nightingale (1939) with John Payne, Private Detective (1939) with Foran, Brother Rat and a Baby (1940) with Reagan, An Angel from Texas (1940) with Albert, Flight Angels  (1940), and Gambling on the High Seas (1940) with Wayne Morris.

She supported in "A"s such as My Love Came Back (1940), starring Olivia de Havilland and Jeffrey Lynn. She and Reagan were in Tugboat Annie Sails Again (1940). Wyman supported Ann Sheridan in Honeymoon for Three (1941) and was Dennis Morgan's leading lady in Bad Men of Missouri (1941).

Wyman made The Body Disappears (1941) with Jeffrey Lynn and You're in the Army Now (1941) with Jimmy Durante; in the latter she and Regis Toomey had the longest screen kiss in cinema history: 3 minutes and 5 seconds.

Wyman did Larceny, Inc. (1942) with Edward G. Robinson, and My Favorite Spy (1942) with Kay Kyser.

At Fox she supported Betty Grable in Footlight Serenade (1942) then back at Warners supported Olivia de Havilland in Princess O'Rourke (1943).

Warners teamed her with Jack Carson in Make Your Own Bed  (1944) and The Doughgirls (1944), then she was top billed in Crime by Night (1944). She was one of many stars to cameo in Hollywood Canteen (1944).

Dramatic star

Wyman finally gained critical notice in the film noir The Lost Weekend (1945) made by the team of Billy Wilder and Charles Brackett, who had been impressed by her performance in Princess O'Rourke.  It was only a supporting role – Ray Milland was the lead – but was the second biggest part. Wyman called it "a small miracle".

Wyman remained a supporting actor in One More Tomorrow (1946), and Night and Day (1946). However Wyman was borrowed by MGM for the female lead in The Yearling (1946), and was nominated for the 1946 Academy Award for Best Actress.

She was leading lady for Dennis Morgan in Cheyenne (1947) and James Stewart in RKO's Magic Town (1947).

Johnny Belinda and "A" film stardom
Her breakthrough role was playing a deaf-mute rape victim in Johnny Belinda (1948). Wyman spent over six months preparing for the film which was an enormous hit and won Wyman a Best Actress Oscar. She was the first person in the sound era to win an acting Oscar without speaking a line of dialogue. In an amusing acceptance speech, perhaps poking fun at some of her long-winded counterparts, Wyman took her statue and said only, "I accept this, very gratefully, for keeping my mouth shut once. I think I'll do it again."

Wyman was now a top billed star. She did two comedies, A Kiss in the Dark (1948) with David Niven and The Lady Takes a Sailor (1949) with Morgan, then made a thriller in England, Stage Fright (1950) for Alfred Hitchcock.

She played Laura in The Glass Menagerie (1950), and went to MGM for Three Guys Named Mike (1951), a popular comedy.

Frank Capra used her as Bing Crosby's leading lady in Here Comes the Groom (1951) at Paramount, then she had the lead in RKO's The Blue Veil (1951), a melodrama that was a big box office hit and earned her an Oscar nomination.

Wyman was one of many stars in Warner Bros' Starlift (1951). She was the female lead in The Story of Will Rogers (1952) and Paramount reunited her and Crosby in Just for You (1952). Wyman expressed interest around this time of doing no more "weepy" roles.

Columbia cast her in a musical, Let's Do It Again (1953) with Ray Milland, then at Warners she was in So Big (1953), a melodrama.

Universal melodramas and television

Wyman had a huge success when producer Ross Hunter cast her alongside Rock Hudson in Magnificent Obsession (1954). It earned her another Oscar nomination.

Wyman and Hudson were promptly reteamed on All That Heaven Allows (1955). Pine-Thomas Productions put Wyman in Lucy Gallant (1955) with Charlton Heston. She did Miracle in the Rain (1956) with Van Johnson. Wyman was meant to follow this with Annabella but it appears to have not been made.

Her first guest-starring television role was on a 1955 episode of General Electric Theater, a show hosted by her former husband Ronald Reagan.  Wyman began a TV series Jane Wyman Presents The Fireside Theatre (1955–58). In its first season it was known as Fireside Theatre then being changed to Jane Wyman Theatre. Wyman hosted every episode, acted in half, and was a producer.

When Fireside Theatre ended Wyman was no longer a film star, but she remained in demand. She replaced the ailing Gene Tierney in Holiday for Lovers (1959) for Fox, and next appeared in Disney's Pollyanna (1960) and Bon Voyage! (1962).

Wyman continued to guest star on TV shows like Checkmate, Westinghouse Desilu Playhouse, Bob Hope Presents the Chrysler Theatre, The Investigators, Wagon Train, and Insight.

"Something happened in the sixties," she later said. "it seemed that the time didn't permit women to be part of it except in a sort of secondary sort of way which I resented. I kept telling myself 'I didn't want to play Whatever Happened to Baby Jane." So she went into semi-retirement around 1962.

Semi-retirement
Wyman focused on painting. She made the occasional acting appearance, mostly on television.

In 1966, Reginald Denham announced Wyman would appear in a play Wonderful Us based on the Parker–Hulme murder case but it was not produced.

She returned to films with How to Commit Marriage (1969).

Wyman continued to work in the 1970s, guest starring on My Three Sons; The Bold Ones: The New Doctors; The Sixth Sense; and Owen Marshall, Counselor at Law and starring in films like The Failing of Raymond (1971) and The Incredible Journey of Doctor Meg Laurel (1979). She starred in a pilot for a TV series Amanda Fallon but it was not picked up.

She guest starred on Charlie's Angels and The Love Boat.

She was offered roles of "murderers, old ladies that were senile – they were awful. The weirdest kind of writing."

Falcon Crest
In the spring of 1981, Wyman's career enjoyed a resurgence when she was cast as the scheming Californian vintner and matriarch Angela Channing in The Vintage Years, which was retooled as the primetime soap opera Falcon Crest.  Wyman said she wanted to make it as it was a change from "the four handkerchief bits" she was known for. "You just can't miss on a thing like this," she added.

The series, which ran from December 1981 to May 1990, was created by Earl Hamner, who had created The Waltons a decade earlier.  Hamner called Wyman "one of the legendary stars... a great actress", strongly denying her casting was due to her connection to the then-current president.

Also starring on the show was an already established character actress, Susan Sullivan, as Angela's niece-in-law, Maggie Gioberti, and the relatively unknown actor Lorenzo Lamas as Angela's irresponsible grandson, Lance Cumson. The on- and off-screen chemistry between Wyman and Lamas helped fuel the series' success.

In its first season, Falcon Crest was a ratings hit, behind other 1980s prime-time soap operas, such as Dallas and Knots Landing, but initially ahead of rival Dynasty. Cesar Romero appeared from 1985 to 1987 on Falcon Crest as the romantic interest of Angela Channing. 

For her role as Angela Channing, Wyman was nominated for a Soap Opera Digest Award five times (for Outstanding Actress in a Leading Role and for Outstanding Villainess: Prime Time Serial), and was also nominated for a Golden Globe award in 1983 and 1984. Her 1984 Golden Globe nomination resulted in a win for Wyman, who took home the award for Best Performance By an Actress in a TV Series. Later in the show's run, Wyman suffered several health problems. In 1986, she had abdominal surgery which caused her to miss two episodes (her character simply "disappeared" under mysterious circumstances). In 1988, she missed another episode due to ill health and was told by her doctors to avoid work. However, she wanted to continue working, and she completed the rest of the 1988–1989 season while her health continued to deteriorate. Months later in 1989, Wyman collapsed on the set and was hospitalized due to problems with diabetes and a liver ailment. Her doctors told her that she should end her acting career. Wyman was absent for most of the ninth and final season of Falcon Crest in 1989–1990 (her character was written out of the series by making her comatose in a hospital bed following an attempted murder).

Against her doctor's advice, she returned for the final three episodes in 1990, even writing a soliloquy for the series finale. Wyman ultimately appeared in almost every episode until the beginning of the ninth and final season, for a total of 208 of the show's 227 episodes.

After Falcon Crest, Wyman acted only once more, playing Jane Seymour's screen mother in a 1993 episode of Dr. Quinn, Medicine Woman. Following this, she retired from acting permanently. Wyman had starred in 83 movies and two successful TV series, and was nominated for an Academy Award four times, winning once.

Personal life

Marriages
Wyman married five times. Her last two marriages were both to Frederick Karger.

Ernest Wyman
Wyman married salesman Ernest Eugene Wyman in Los Angeles, California, on April 8, 1933. Wyman recorded her name as 'Jane Fulks' on the wedding certificate. She also listed foster parents Emma and Richard Fulks as her parents. In keeping with the tendency of making herself older than she really was, she gave her age as 19 on the document. Truthfully, she had turned 16 just three months prior. The couple would divorce after two years. Wyman kept her first husband's surname professionally for the remainder of her life.

Myron Futterman
Wyman married Myron Martin Futterman, a dress manufacturer, in New Orleans on June 29, 1937. As Wyman wanted children but Futterman did not, they separated after only three months of marriage and divorced on December 5, 1938.

Ronald Reagan

In 1938, Wyman co-starred with Ronald Reagan in Brother Rat (1938), and its sequel Brother Rat and a Baby (1940). They were engaged at the Chicago Theatre, and married on January 26, 1940, at the Wee Kirk o' the Heather in Glendale, California. She and Reagan had three children; Maureen Elizabeth Reagan, their adopted son Michael Edward Reagan, and Christine Reagan (premature, lived one day June 26, 1947). Wyman, who was a registered Republican, stated that their break-up was due to a difference in politics (Ronald Reagan was still a Democrat at the time). She filed for divorce in 1948; the divorce was final in 1949 and Wyman leased a home in Palm Springs, California. In 1981, Ronald Reagan became the first divorcé to assume the nation's highest office. This made Wyman the first former wife of an American president who was still living at the time that her former husband became president. Although she remained silent during Reagan's political career, she told a newspaper interviewer in 1968 that this was not because she was bitter or because she did not agree with him politically:

In spite of her divorce, according to her former personal assistant, Wyman still voted for her former husband in the 1980 and 1984 presidential elections.

Frederick Karger
Following her divorce from Reagan, Wyman married German-American Hollywood music director and composer Frederick M. "Fred" Karger on November 1, 1952, at El Montecito Presbyterian Church, Santa Barbara. They separated on November 7, 1954, and were granted an interlocutory divorce decree on December 7, 1954; the divorce was finalized on December 30, 1955. They remarried on March 11, 1961, and Karger divorced her again on March 9, 1965. According to The New York Times' report of the divorce, the bandleader charged that the actress "had walked out on him." Wyman had a stepdaughter, Terry, from Karger's marriage to Patti Sacks.

Wyman, who had converted to Catholicism in 1953, never remarried. She was a member of the Good Shepherd Parish and the Catholic Motion Picture Guild in Beverly Hills, California.

Later life
After Falcon Crest ended, Wyman made a guest appearance on the CBS series Dr. Quinn, Medicine Woman and then completely retired from acting; she spent her retirement painting and entertaining friends. Wyman was a recluse and made only a few public appearances in her last years in part due to suffering from arthritis. Wyman also suffered from Type 1 diabetes from a very young age. She did attend her daughter's funeral in 2001 after Maureen died of melanoma; Ronald Reagan was unable to attend due to his Alzheimer's disease. She also attended the funeral of her long-time friend Loretta Young in 2000. Wyman broke her silence about her former husband upon his death in 2004. She issued an official statement that read, "America has lost a great president and a great, kind, and gentle man." She also attended his funeral.

Death
Wyman died at the age of 90 at her home in Rancho Mirage on September 10, 2007. Wyman's son, Michael Reagan, released a statement saying:

Wyman reportedly died in her sleep of natural causes. A member of the Dominican Order (as a lay tertiary) of the Catholic Church, she was buried in a nun's habit. She was interred at Forest Lawn Mortuary and Memorial Park in Cathedral City, California.

Filmography

Film

Box office ranking 
For several years, film exhibitors voted Wyman as among the most popular stars in the country:
 1949 – 25th (US), 6th (UK)
 1952 – 15th most popular (US)
 1953 – 19th (US)
 1954 – 9th (US)
 1955 – 18th (US)
 1956 – 23rd (US)

Television

Radio appearances

Awards and nominations

Wyman has two stars on the Hollywood Walk of Fame: one for motion pictures, at 6607 Hollywood Boulevard; and one for television, at 1620 Vine Street.

References

Further reading
 Bubbeo, Daniel. The women of Warner Brothers: the lives and careers of 15 leading ladies, with filmographies for each (McFarland, 2010).
 Lafferty, William. "'No Attempt at Artiness, Profundity, or Significance': 'Fireside Theater' and the Rise of Filmed Television Programming." Cinema Journal (1987): 23–46 online.
 Leff, Leonard J. "What in the World Interests Women? Hollywood, Postwar America, and 'Johnny Belinda.'" Journal of American Studies 31#32 (1997), pp. 385–405. online
 Morella, Joe, and Edward Z. Epstein. Jane Wyman (Dell, 1986).

External links

 Jane Wyman Official website
 Jane Wyman, 90, Star of Film and TV, Is Dead
 
 
 
 
 
 Tough Love  Reminisces by Michael Reagan
 Obituary in the Boston Globe
 Jane Wyman at Virtual History

1917 births
2007 deaths
20th-century American actresses
21st-century American women
Actors from St. Joseph, Missouri
Actresses from Missouri
Actresses from Palm Springs, California
American film actresses
American soap opera actresses
American television actresses
Best Actress Academy Award winners
Best Drama Actress Golden Globe (film) winners
Best Drama Actress Golden Globe (television) winners
Burials at Forest Lawn Cemetery (Cathedral City)
California Republicans
Catholics from California
Catholics from Missouri
Converts to Roman Catholicism
Deaths from arthritis
Deaths from diabetes
People from Rancho Mirage, California
Reagan family
Universal Pictures contract players
Warner Bros. contract players